Julije Makanec (Sarajevo, 19 September 1904 – Zagreb, 7 June 1945) was a Croatian politician, teacher, philosopher and writer. During the World War II in Yugoslavia, he was the Minister of Education of the Independent State of Croatia and a high-ranking member of the Ustashas.

Early life
Makanec was born in Sarajevo. He was educated in Osijek and Bihać, and studied philosophy at the University of Zagreb, where he obtained a Ph.D. in 1927. Between 1929 and 1940 he served as a gymnasium professor in Koprivnica, Bjelovar and several other places in Croatia, as well as in Leskovac, Serbia.  In November 1940, as a member of the Croatian Peasant Party, he became the mayor of Bjelovar. Here he played an important role in the Bjelovar rebellion of 8 April that year when, after the revolt by Croats in the Royal Yugoslav Army during the early days of invasion of Yugoslavia, he declared the "resurrection of the Croatian state".

World War II
By his own account, Makanec swore the Ustaše oath in April 1941, days after the establishment of the Independent State of Croatia, but historians believe Makanec may have joined the Ustaše much earlier, in late 1939 or early 1940. Shortly after the formation of the Ustaše government he served as adjutant in the Croatian army's Bilogora headquarters, in Bjelovar. From 1942 he was the chief of spiritual upbringing in the Ustaša Youth. In March 1943 he was named extraordinary professor of philosophy at the Faculty of Philosophy in Zagreb. In October 1943 he became the Independent State of Croatia's Minister of National Education. He also wrote books in his field as well as contributing to various periodicals and newspapers.

In a 1942 brochure titled Ustaše Virtues, Makanec openly advocated for genocide. He wrote: "[...] every community has the right to exterminate, destroy, or at least render harmless those individuals who weaken it and bring it to ruin due to their utter lack of virtue."

On 6 May 1945, shortly before Yugoslav Partisans entered Zagreb, Makanec fled the city in a group of sixteen government ministers. On 17 May, they surrendered to the British in Tamsweg, Austria, and were extradited to Yugoslav authorities. After a one-day trial before a military tribunal in Zagreb on 6 June he was sentenced to death for high treason and war crimes and executed by firing squad in the morning of the following day.

Works
Books:
 Marksistička filozofija prirode (Zagreb, 1938)
 O podrijetlu i smislu države (Zagreb, 1939)
 Poglavnik o boljševizmu (Zagreb, 1942)
  (Zagreb, 1942)
 Veliko raskršće (Zagreb, 1942)
 Razvoj državne misli od Platona do Hegela (Zagreb, 1943)
 Hrvatski vidici'' (Zagreb, 1944)

References

Sources

Further reading

 
 

1904 births
1945 deaths
Writers from Sarajevo
20th-century Croatian philosophers
Croatian nobility
Croatian writers
Faculty of Humanities and Social Sciences, University of Zagreb alumni
Croatian collaborators with Fascist Italy
Croatian collaborators with Nazi Germany
Croatian people of World War II
Mayors of places in Croatia
Government ministers of the Independent State of Croatia
Executed Yugoslav collaborators with Nazi Germany
Executed politicians
Executed Croatian people
Executed Bosnia and Herzegovina people
Ustaše
Genocide of Serbs in the Independent State of Croatia perpetrators
People executed by Yugoslavia by firing squad
People extradited from the United Kingdom
People extradited to Yugoslavia
Croats of Bosnia and Herzegovina